Christopher Maurice Wooh (born 18 September 2001) is a professional footballer who plays as a defender for Ligue 1 club Rennes. Born in France, he plays for the Cameroon national team.

Club career

Nancy 
Wooh is a youth product of Puiseux Louvres, Chantilly and Nancy. He made his professional debut with Nancy in a 1–0 Coupe de France loss to Sochaux on 20 January 2021.

Lens 
On 1 June 2021, Wooh agreed to a four-year contract with Ligue 1 club Lens, effective from 1 July.

Rennes 
On 31 August 2022, Wooh signed to a four-year contract with Rennes.

International career
Born in France, Wooh is of Cameroonian descent. In 2022, he was selected by Rigobert Song to represent the Cameroon national team for the first time in his career, for the upcoming matchups of the Africa Cup 2023. He debuted with them in a 1–0 2023 Africa Cup of Nations qualification win over Burundi on 9 June 2022.

References

External links
 
 FFF Profile
 CAN 2023 : Wooh, Nkoudou, Ondoa et Gonzalez présélectionnés
 

2001 births
Living people
Footballers from Val-d'Oise
Cameroonian footballers
Cameroon international footballers
French footballers
French sportspeople of Cameroonian descent
Association football defenders
Ligue 1 players
Ligue 2 players
Championnat National 3 players
AS Nancy Lorraine players
RC Lens players
Stade Rennais F.C. players
2022 FIFA World Cup players